The second Isle of Man Tourist Trophy motorcycle race was held on 22 September 1908 on the St John's Short Course, Isle of Man.

1908 The International Motorcycle Tourist Trophy
Tuesday 22 September 1908 – 10 laps (approx 158 ¼ miles) St. John's Short Course.

Sources

External links
 Detailed race results
 Mountain Course map

Isle of Man Tt
1908
Isle of Man Tt